James M. Hare (July 31, 1910 – March 10, 1980) was the Michigan Secretary of State.

Biography
Hare was born James McNeil Hare in Racine, Wisconsin. He died in 1980. Hare was a Unitarian.

Career
Hare was Secretary of State from 1955 to 1970. In 1960, he was a candidate in the Democratic primary for Governor of Michigan, losing to John Swainson. As Secretary of State, Hare called the Michigan Constitutional Convention of 1961 to order.

References

Politicians from Racine, Wisconsin
Secretaries of State of Michigan
Michigan Democrats
1910 births
1980 deaths
20th-century American politicians